Leonard Hope Green (born 2 October 1936) is an English former footballer who made 50 appearances in the Football League playing as a right back for Darlington. He also played non-league football for clubs including Lingfield Lane and Horden Colliery Welfare.

He was a member of the Darlington team that drew with Chelsea, League champions only three seasons earlier, in the fourth round of the 1958–59 FA Cup, and won the replay 4–1 to progress to the last 16 of the competition for only the second time in the club's history.

References

1936 births
Living people
Sportspeople from Bishop Auckland
Footballers from County Durham
English footballers
Association football defenders
Darlington F.C. players
Darlington Town F.C. players
English Football League players